Laurence Esmonde may refer to:

Laurence Esmonde, Lord Esmonde
Sir Laurence Esmonde, 2nd Baronet (died 1688), of the Esmonde baronets
Sir Laurence Esmonde, 3rd Baronet (died c. 1717), of the Esmonde baronets
Sir Laurence Esmonde, 4th Baronet (died 1738), of the Esmonde baronets
Sir Laurence Grattan Esmonde, 13th Baronet (1863–1943), of the Esmonde baronets